A three-point field goal (also known as a "three-pointer" or "3-pointer") is a field goal in a basketball game, made from beyond the three-point line, a designated arc radiating from the basket. A successful attempt is worth three points, in contrast to the two points awarded for shots made inside the three-point line. The National Collegiate Athletic Association (NCAA) keeps records of the Division I 3-point field goal makes per game (3PG) average annual leaders. The statistic was first recognized in Division I women's basketball in the 1987–88 season, when the NCAA made the three-pointer a mandatory feature throughout women's basketball. The women's line would be moved back to match the men's line effective with the 2011–12 season. The women's line remained at 20 ft 9 in until being moved to the FIBA arc in 2021–22.

NCAA record books list single-season three-point record holders both on overall and per-game bases, but the official season leaders are based solely on per-game average. Taylor Pierce of Idaho owns both NCAA single-season records, with 154 threes and an average of 4.53 per game in 2018–19. The all-time leader for career threes, the currently active Taylor Robertson of Oklahoma with 534 through March 17, 2023, has led the country twice (2019–20 and 2021–22). The player with the highest 3PG average over the span of her entire career (with a minimum of 150 made threes) is Alabama State's Lisa McMullen, who made 4.00 per game over two years.

Key

3-point field goals per game

Footnotes

References
General

Specific

NCAA Division I women's basketball statistical leaders